Robert Douglas Fry (September 1872 – 9 July 1911) was an English Australian painter and illustrator, known for his paintings of animals, and especially horses.

Biography 
Douglas Fry was born at Ipswich, Suffolk, England, son of Edward Fry, a corn and seed merchant, and his wife Annette née Ransome. His brother, Edward Ransome Fry, was also an artist, and his sister Constance Emily Fry married John Barlow Wood (1862-1949) a watercolour landscape artist.

Douglas was educated at Ipswich Grammar School. Later he studied art at the Académie Julian in Paris, and in London where he did some illustrative work.

In 1899 Douglas Fry came to Australia. He lived in Melbourne for some time, did some paintings of horses, and then went on to Sydney where he became a member of the Society of Artists. In 1908 his "Mountain King" was purchased for the Art Gallery of New South Wales. He did illustrative work for The Lone Hand and was a frequent exhibitor with the Society of Artists. His reputation was steadily growing when he died from pneumonia on 9 July 1911 in Neutral Bay, New South Wales at the early age of 39.

Fry was a keen hunter, described by a contemporary as a "tall, lean, monosyllbic Englishman who had an intensely conservative mind and a pronounced Oxford accent, and looked as if he had been poured into his riding pants and boots (which he always wore)". He was a keen horseman and is said to have taught Norman Lindsay to ride.

Fry was regarded by his contemporaries as the best equine artist in Australia. Interested in the differing characteristics of horses, he made many studies of them before finishing each work. He was an excellent draughtsman and as a painter endeavoured to paint the thing exactly as he saw it, with a high degree of finish.

Notes and references

External links 
 R. Douglas Fry   (1872-1911) at artnet, examples of his work and auction prices

1872 births
1911 deaths
Australian people of English descent
Artists from Ipswich
20th-century Australian painters
20th-century Australian male artists
Australian male painters